Isaiah Crockett (currently known as Hot Spot, formerly Joto, and originally named Slagger, Issaiah) is a character appearing in media published by DC Comics. The character is a superhero and former member of the Teen Titans.

Publication history
Isaiah Crockett first appeared in Teen Titans (vol. 2) #1, and was created by Dan Jurgens.

Fictional character biography
Isaiah's mother was already pregnant with him when she married Judge Crockett, who was unaware that the unborn child was half-alien (part Human and part H'San Natall). At age 16, Isaiah qualified to enter college, but on his first day at Ivy University, he and two other students (Toni Monettia who would later become Argent, and Cody Driscoll who would later become Risk) were abducted by the H'san Natall. Also abducted was The Atom, who was caught in the energy stream as well. On board the alien ship, they rescued the Earth girl who would later become Prysm, and from there they escaped. During these events, the students learned that they were all half H'san Natall. They stayed together and formed another incarnation of the Teen Titans.

Isaiah initially took up the name Slagger, but his father suggested another codename, Joto, which is Swahili for "heat". During a battle with Haze (Jarrod Jupiter), he was badly burned. Before he died, he touched Prysm on the cheek, sending out a heat pulse with his life essence into her. Later, the H'san Natall had repaired his body, although he was a mindless killing machine in this state. When Prysm came within close proximity of him, his life essence transferred back into his body and he regained control. Together, the Titans and Superman were able to talk the H'san Natall out of further aggression. The team disbanded and went their own ways. Joto would later aid the Titans during the Technis Imperative conflict, which also involved the Justice League and all past Titan members.

During the one-year gap depicted in 52, Isaiah briefly rejoined the newest incarnation of the Teen Titans under the name Hot Spot. During the events leading up to Final Crisis, Hot Spot was one of the young heroes considered for the team membership drive. Ultimately, Isaiah was passed over in favor of Static, Aquagirl, and Kid Eternity.

During Superboy-Prime's attack on Titans Tower, Hot Spot (along with Prysm and Argent) appeared as one of many former and prospective Teen Titans who arrived to assist the current team.

During the "Dark Nights: Metal" storyline, Hot Spot is shown as a member of the Teen Titans. He nearly killed Replicant before Sideways intervened.

During the Heroes in Crisis storyline, Hot Spot is among the heroes killed in an energy blast caused by Savitar.

Powers and abilities
Hot Spot originally had the power to increase the temperature of any object he touched, and he could sense heat via a kind of infrared vision. His original Joto costume was equipped with a wrist mounted cannon, with which he could fire projectiles which were superheated by his powers.

During One Year Later, Hot Spot's powers seem to have evolved, allowing him to fly and surround himself with an aura of flame. Any other new powers have yet to be seen. This change in his powers and name seem to be inspired by the characterization he received in the animated series.

In other media
 Isaiah Crockett appears in Teen Titans, voiced by Khary Payton in his first appearance and by Bumper Robinson in later appearances. This version was originally going to be named "Joto" until the production team learned the word is a derogatory Spanish term for homosexuals and renamed him "Hot Spot", which later carried over to the comics. Following a minor appearance in the episode "Winner Take All", in which he becomes an honorary member of the Teen Titans, the Brotherhood of Evil capture him and use his communicator in their plot to eliminate young heroes around the world. However, the Teen Titans regroup, rescue the Brotherhood's captives, and defeat them.
 Isaiah Crockett / Hot Spot appears in the 2004 comic series Teen Titans Go!.

References

Comics characters introduced in 1996
DC Comics superheroes
DC Comics hybrids
DC Comics metahumans
African-American superheroes
Characters created by Dan Jurgens
Fictional characters with fire or heat abilities
Fictional extraterrestrial–human hybrids in comics